William John Atkinson (12 October 1876 – 26 September 1966) was an Australian rules footballer who played with Melbourne in the Victorian Football League (VFL).

Notes

External links 

 

1876 births
1966 deaths
Australian rules footballers from Victoria (Australia)
Melbourne Football Club players